Willie Williams, Jr. (born September 19, 1984) is a former American football defensive tackle. He was signed by the St. Louis Rams as an undrafted free agent in 2008. He played college football at Louisville.

Williams has also been a member of the Philadelphia Eagles, Florida Tuskers, and Omaha Nighthawks.

Early years
Williams played high school football at Thomson High School, in Thomson, Georgia.

College career
Williams played two seasons at Louisville after transferring from Georgia Military College in Milledgeville, GA. In 2007, he played in 12 games with eight starts and had 31 tackles with 8 sacks. In 2006, he played in 11 games with one start as a junior and recorded 10 tackles with 3 sacks He was part of a Georgia Military College team that posted a 9-2 record . While at Junior College he registered 35 tackles with 3.0 sacks at Georgia Military. Williams also had a stint at Hutchinson Community College in Hutchinson, Kan.

Professional career

St. Louis Rams
Williams was signed by the St. Louis Rams as an undrafted free agent. He was waived on July 29, 2009.

Philadelphia Eagles
Williams was signed by the Philadelphia Eagles on August 1, 2009. He was waived on September 4, 2009.

External links
 Just Sports Stats
 Louisville Cardinals bio

1984 births
Living people
Players of American football from Georgia (U.S. state)
American football defensive tackles
Louisville Cardinals football players
St. Louis Rams players
Philadelphia Eagles players
Florida Tuskers players
Omaha Nighthawks players
People from Milledgeville, Georgia
Sacramento Mountain Lions players